Leo Charles Lynton Blair (born Charles Leonard Augustus Parsons; 4 August 192316 November 2012) was a British barrister and law lecturer at Durham University. He was the author of the book The Commonwealth Public Service.  He was the father of Sir Tony Blair, the former Prime Minister of the United Kingdom, and of Sir William Blair, a High Court judge.

Early life 
Born Charles Leonard Augustus Parsons in Filey, East Riding of Yorkshire, England, he was the illegitimate son of two middle class travelling entertainers. His father, Charles Parsons (1887–1970), had the stage name Jimmy Lynton while his mother, Mary Augusta Ridgway Bridson (1886–1969), was known as Celia Ridgway and was a daughter of Augustus William Bridson (1849–1933) and Maria Emily Montford (1864–1944). The couple met on tour in England. Their hectic lifestyles prompted them to give up baby Leo, who was fostered out to (and later adopted by) a working-class couple, a Glasgow shipyard worker named James Blair and his wife Mary, taking their surname. On 2 June 1927, his biological parents married and tried to reclaim him, but Mary Blair refused to return him and later prevented him from contacting his birth parents. (Leo later had a reunion with his half-sister, Pauline Harding, .)

Blair grew up in a tenement in Golspie Street, Govan, Glasgow, and attended Govan High School. When he left school, he worked as a copy boy on the Communist Party newspaper The Daily Worker. He was secretary of the Scottish Young Communist League from 1938 to 1941. 

Blair next worked briefly in the Glasgow City Public Assistance Department before enlisting in the Royal Corps of Signals for service in the Second World War in 1942; he was demobilised with the acting rank of major in 1947.

He studied law at the University of Edinburgh, becoming a barrister and later, a university law lecturer.

Marriage and children 
Blair married Hazel Elizabeth Rosaleen Corscadden from a Protestant family in Donegal, Ireland. They were married by the future Moderator, Rev William Roy Sanderson, at Barony Church in Glasgow. They had two sons, both of whom attended Fettes College (an independent school in Edinburgh), and a daughter. Their first son, Sir William Blair, a banking and finance law specialist, became a High Court judge. Their second son, Anthony Charles Lynton Blair (Tony Blair), was born in 1953 and also became a barrister before becoming a politician and, in 1997, Prime Minister of the United Kingdom. At the end of 1954, the family moved to Adelaide, Australia, for  years, where Blair lectured in law at the University of Adelaide.

Blair and his family later returned to England, living in Durham, where Blair lectured in law at Durham University Law School. He was a member of St Cuthbert's Society, one of the university's collegiate bodies. In 1959, he was awarded a PhD from the University of Edinburgh for a thesis entitled "The legal status of the governmental employee". Despite having been a communist in his youth, Leo became active in the Conservative Party. He had ambitions to stand for Parliament in Durham, hoping to become a candidate in the 1964 general election, which were thwarted when he suffered a stroke in 1963 at the age of 40. Following Blair's stroke, he had to rely heavily on his wife Hazel to look after him.

Later life 
Blair joined the Labour Party when his son became its leader in 1994, citing pride at his son's achievements, his dissatisfaction with the Conservatives under John Major and his objection to railway privatisation. He had previously been "a huge supporter" of Conservative prime minister Margaret Thatcher.

Blair's first wife, Hazel (12 June 192328 June 1975), died of thyroid cancer. He remarried and lived in Shrewsbury, Shropshire, with his second wife, Olwen, until her death on 15 March 2012. Cherie and Tony Blair named their youngest son Leo after him.

Blair was a "militant atheist", according to his son Tony.

Blair died in Shrewsbury aged 89 on 16 November 2012.

Academic work 
Blair's book The Commonwealth Public Service (1958) was described by the journal Canadian Public Administration as "an excellent primer on the Australian Federal Public Service".

References 

1923 births
2012 deaths
Academics of Durham University
English adoptees
English atheists
English barristers
Members of the Bar of England and Wales
People educated at Govan High School
Lawyers from Glasgow
People from Govan
People from Filey
Conservative Party (UK) people
Conservative Party (UK) politicians
Parents of prime ministers of the United Kingdom
20th-century English lawyers
British Army personnel of World War II
British Army officers